Alivia Sarkar (born 20 May 1993) is an Indian model and Bengali actress who works primarily in TV soap operas. She is well known for portraying the female antagonists Malini Sen in Joyee and Tiya in Seemarekha.

Filmography

Television

Films
Lady Chatterjee (Bengali) (2022)
Abar Aranyer Din Ratri  (Bengali) (2022)
Horror Stories (Bengali) (2022)
Shades of Life (Bengali) (2022)
Ei Ami Renu (2021)
Ki Kore Toke Bolbo (2016)

Web series

Break Up Story (2020)
Montu Pilot (2019-2022)
Murder by the Sea (Bengali) (2022)

References

External links 
 

Living people
1993 births
Bengali television actresses
21st-century Indian actresses
Bengali actresses
Indian web series actresses
Actresses in Bengali television
Actresses in Bengali cinema